Effigy, in comics, may refer to:

 Effigy (DC Comics)
 Effigy (Marvel Comics)

See also
 Effigy (disambiguation)